Scytalocrinus is an extinct genus of crinoids.

Fossil records
This genus is known in the fossil records of the Carboniferous period of United States and United Kinhgdom (age range: from 345.3 to 314.6 million years ago).

Species
 Scytalocrinus barumensis Whidborne 1896
 Scytalocrinus crassibrachiatus Moore and Strimple 1973
 Scytalocrinus sansabensis Moore and Plummer 1940

References 

 See also List of crinoid genera

Cladida
Prehistoric crinoid genera